Dark Recollections is the only album by the death metal band, Carnage, released in 1990.  It was originally released as a split CD with Cadaver's debut album Hallucinating Anxiety on the Earache Records sublabel Necrosis. Some of the songs were later re-recorded by Dismember. Dark Recollections is the only album released by Carnage; the band had broken up by the time the album hit the streets. It was later reissued by Earache Records with eight additional tracks, taken from the demos for The Day Man Lost  and  Infestation of Evil.

"Deranged From Blood", "Death Evocation", "Blasphemies Of The Flesh" and "Self Dissection" previously appeared on Dismember demos circa 1988–1989, before Fred Estby and David Blomqvist joined Carnage.  Dismember also officially recorded "Death Evocation" (a bonus track on reissues of Like an Ever Flowing Stream) and "Torn Apart" (on the Pieces EP).

Track listing
All songs written by Carnage.

Personnel on Original Release
 Matti Kärki - vocals
 Michael Amott - guitar, bass (on original version of the album)
 David Blomqvist - guitar
 Johnny Dordevic - bass (credited but did not play on the album)
 Fred Estby - drums (also on bonus tracks 17 and 18)

Personnel on Bonus Tracks
Johan Axelsson: Vocals (tracks 11-18), bass (tracks 11-16)
Fred Blomkvist: Guitars
Michael Amott: Guitars
Johnny Dordevic: Bass (on tracks 17-18)
Jeppe Larsen: Drums (on tracks 11-16)

Production
Produced by Carnage and Tomas Skogsberg
Recording and Mix Engineer: Tomas Skogsberg
 Dan Seagrave - Cover artwork

References

1990 debut albums
Carnage (band) albums
Albums with cover art by Dan Seagrave
Earache Records albums